Jaldam is a village in Rowthulapudi Mandal, Kakinada district in the state of Andhra Pradesh in India.

Geography 

Demographics 
 India census, Jaldam had a population of 223, out of which 106 were male and 117 were female. The population of children below 6 years of age was 27. The literacy rate of the village was 40.82%.

References 

Villages in Rowthulapudi mandal